A general election was held in the U.S. state of Rhode Island on November 8, 2022. All of Rhode Island's executive officers were up for election as well as both of Rhode Island's two seats in the United States House of Representatives.

U.S. House

Governor

Lieutenant Governor

Secretary of State

Attorney General

General Treasurer

External links
Candidates at Vote Smart 
Candidates at Ballotpedia
Campaign finance at OpenSecrets

2022 Rhode Island elections
Rhode Island